Berkel may refer to:

The river Berkel in the east of the Netherlands
Berkel Westpolder RandstadRail station
The former village of Berkel (South Holland), now part of Berkel en Rodenrijs
The former village of Berkel (North Brabant), now part of Berkel-Enschot
Avery Berkel, a major manufacturer of weighing systems
The Berkel meat slicer
Berkel (crater), a crater on Mercury
Berkel-Enschot railway station
Berkel railway station

People with the surname
Ben van Berkel (born 1957), Dutch architect
Christian Berkel (born 1957), German actor
Gary J. Van Berkel, research scientist who leads the Organic and Biological Mass Spectrometry Group at Oak Ridge National Laboratory
Rosemary Berkel and Harry L. Crisp II Museum
Tim Berkel (Timothy Peter Van Berkel) (born 1984), Australian triathlete

Dutch-language surnames
German-language surnames